Mark K. Kirkeby (born March 19, 1960 in Mobridge, South Dakota) is an American politician and a Republican member of the South Dakota Senate representing District 35 since January 8, 2013. Kirkeby served consecutively in the South Dakota Legislature from January 2007 until January 8, 2013 in the South Dakota House of Representatives District 35 seat.

Education
Kirkeby earned his BA in business administration and his BS in political science from Black Hills State University.

Elections
2012 When incumbent Senate District 35 Republican Senator Jeffrey Haverly left the Legislature and left the District 35 seat open, Kirkeby was unopposed for both the June 5, 2012 Republican Primary and also the November 6, 2012 General election, winning with 5,382 votes.
2000 Kirkeby challenged incumbent House District 35 Republican Representatives Alice McCoy and William Napoli in the three-way June 6, 2000 Republican Primary, but placed third behind them; they went on to win the four-way November 7, 2000 General election where Representative Napoli took the first seat and Representative McCoy took the second seat ahead of Democratic nominees Theresa Spry and Gary Sisco.
2006 When House District 35 incumbent Republican Representative McCoy ran for South Dakota Senate and left a District 35 seat open, Kirkeby ran in the four-way June 6, 2006 Republican Primary and placed first with 858 votes (32.9%); in the four-way November 7, 2006 General election incumbent Republican Representative Jeffrey Haverly took the first seat and Kirkeby took the second seat with 3,326 votes (31.6%) ahead of Democratic nominee Laurie Wudtke and Independent candidate John Buxcel.

2008 When House District 35 incumbent Republican Representative Haverly ran for South Dakota Senate, Kirkeby ran in the three-way June 3, 2008 Republican Primary and placed first with 735 votes (43.2%), in the four-way November 4, 2008 General election Kirkeby took the first seat with 4,556 votes (33%) and fellow Republican nominee Don Kopp took the second seat ahead of Democratic nominees Fern Johnson and Curtis Marquardt.
2010 Kirkeby and Kopp were unopposed for the June 8, 2010 Republican Primary and won the four-way November 2, 2010 General election, where Kirkeby took the first seat with 3,609 votes (35.3%) and Representative Kopp took the second seat ahead of Democratic nominee Sharon Green and Independent candidate Jay Pond.

References

External links
Official page at the South Dakota Legislature

1960 births
Living people
Black Hills State University alumni
Republican Party members of the South Dakota House of Representatives
Politicians from Rapid City, South Dakota
People from Mobridge, South Dakota
Republican Party South Dakota state senators